In philosophy, Pascal's mugging is a thought-experiment demonstrating a problem in expected utility maximization. A rational agent should choose actions whose outcomes, when weighed by their probability, have higher utility. But some very unlikely outcomes may have very great utilities, and these utilities can grow faster than the probability diminishes. Hence the agent should focus more on vastly improbable cases with implausibly high rewards; this leads first to counter-intuitive choices, and then to incoherence as the utility of every choice becomes unbounded.

The name refers to Pascal's Wager, but unlike the wager, it does not require infinite rewards. This sidesteps many objections to the Pascal's Wager dilemma that are based on the nature of infinity.

Problem statement
The term "Pascal's mugging" to refer to this problem was originally coined by Eliezer Yudkowsky in the Less Wrong forum. Philosopher Nick Bostrom later elaborated the thought experiment in the form of a fictional dialogue. Subsequently, other authors published their own sequels to the events of this first dialogue, adopting the same literary style.

In Bostrom's description, Blaise Pascal is accosted by a mugger who has forgotten their weapon. However, the mugger proposes a deal: the philosopher gives them his wallet, and in exchange the mugger will return twice the amount of money tomorrow. Pascal declines, pointing out that it is unlikely the deal will be honoured. The mugger then continues naming higher rewards, pointing out that even if it is just one chance in 1000 that they will be honourable, it would make sense for Pascal to make a deal for a 2000 times return. Pascal responds that the probability for that high return is even lower than one in 1000. The mugger argues back that for any low probability of being able to pay back a large amount of money (or pure utility) there exists a finite amount that makes it rational to take the bet—and given human fallibility and philosophical scepticism a rational person must admit there is at least some non-zero chance that such a deal would be possible. In one example, the mugger succeeds by promising Pascal 1,000 quadrillion happy days of life. Convinced by the argument, Pascal gives the mugger the wallet.

In one of Yudkowsky's examples, the mugger succeeds by saying "give me five dollars, or I'll use my magic powers from outside the Matrix to run a Turing machine that simulates and kills  people". Here, the number  uses Knuth's up-arrow notation; writing the number out in base 10 would require enormously more writing material than there are atoms in the known universe.

The supposed paradox results from two inconsistent views. On the other side of the argument, paying the mugger is intuitively irrational due to its exploitability. If the person being mugged agrees to this sequence of logic, then they can be exploited repeatedly for all of their money, resulting in a Dutch-book, which is typically considered irrational. Views on which of these arguments is logically correct differ.

Moreover, in many reasonable-seeming decision systems, Pascal's mugging causes the expected utility of any action to fail to converge, as an unlimited chain of successively dire scenarios similar to Pascal's mugging would need to be factored in.

Some of the arguments concerning this paradox affect not only the expected utility maximization theory, but may also apply to other theoretical systems, such as consequentialist ethics, for example.

Consequences and remedies

Philosopher Nick Bostrom argues that Pascal's mugging, like Pascal's wager, suggests that giving a superintelligent artificial intelligence a flawed decision theory could be disastrous. Pascal's mugging may also be relevant when considering low-probability, high-stakes events such as existential risk or charitable interventions with a low probability of success but extremely high rewards. Common sense seems to suggest that spending effort on too unlikely scenarios is irrational.

One advocated remedy might be to only use bounded utility functions: rewards cannot be arbitrarily large. Another approach is to use Bayesian reasoning to (qualitatively) judge the quality of evidence and probability estimates rather than naively calculate expectations. Other approaches are to penalize the prior probability of hypotheses that argue that we are in a surprisingly unique position to affect large numbers of other people who cannot symmetrically affect us, reject providing the probability of a payout first, or abandon quantitative decision procedures in the presence of extremely large risks.

See also
 Decision theory
 Expected utility
 Scope neglect
 St. Petersburg paradox

Notes

References

Thought experiments
Expected utility
Risk
Decision-making paradoxes